Jack Leroy Petersen (born October 25, 1933) is an American jazz guitarist and educator. He was a pedagogical architect for jazz guitar and jazz improvisation at Berklee College of Music, University of North Texas College of Music, and University of North Florida.

Biography
His father, Harold Petersen, worked for LTV and his mother, Effie, worked at Russel-Newman Manufacturing Company. When Jack Petersen was five years old, his family moved to Denton, Texas. He began playing guitar when he was 16 under the influence of Western swing.

He won a course in guitar from a radio contest. The teacher was Bob Hames, a former soldier who was attending University of North Texas. Hames introduced Petersen the music of Charlie Christian, Herb Ellis, Tal Farlow, Barry Galbraith, Barney Kessel, Carl Kress, Oscar Moore, Remo Palmieri, Chuck Wayne. While in high school he and his friend Dick Crockett listened to North Texas Lab Bands and the small groups that performed on campus, and developed their playing style. Petersen graduated from Denton High School 1951.

In 1955, he enlisted in the Army to perform with the 8th US Army Band in Seoul, Korea. While in Seoul, Petersen met many musicians and played eleven gigs a week. After leaving the Army, he attended the University of North Texas to study music. He played cello and double bass in the orchestra and guitar and piano in the jazz ensemble where he collaborated with faculty members Gene Hall and Floyd Graham.

Petersen was proficient on double bass, cello, and piano. This gave him sight-reading skills, an advantage for guitarists of the day who were earning money in recording studios and dance orchestras. Sight-reading and maneuvering jazz progressions (beyond blues, pentatonic, and classic rock) made him a popular guitarist in recording studios, with big bands, and musicians who had little time to teach parts to their sidemen.

Career
 1957: Petersen joined the Hal McIntyre Orchestra on September 8, 1957, in Knoxville, Tennessee, for its European tour.
 1958-1962: Petersen was a Dallas studio musician recording jingles, first as a guitarist and sometimes pianist, then as producer, composer. Much of the work was making IDs for radio stations all over the country. Petersen once remarked in an interview that people don't realize the work that goes into it — "In 20 seconds, you've got to write a whole symphony".
 1960: Gene Hall hired Petersen to teach with him at Stan Kenton Band Clinics. As of 1977, Petersen has been with Stan Kenton Band Clinics for some 17 years.
 1962: Petersen accepted an invitation by Lawrence Berk, Berklee, to design and chair the first formal guitar curriculum at Berklee College of Music. Berk discovered Petersen through his affiliation with the Stan Kenton Band Clinics.
 1965: Petersen returned to Dallas because of high demand to work as a performer and studio musician. 
 Mid 1970s: Leon Breeden invited Petersen to develop the jazz guitar program at North Texas. Petersen, with jazz pianist Dan Haerle, helped lead a jazz improv curriculum that Rich Matteson had revamped.
 1974: Petersen, along with Rich Matteson and Phil Wilson, founded the music publishing company Outrageous Mother, a Texas corporation, to distribute their arrangements.
 1988: Matteson hired Petersen, his longtime colleague, to build a jazz guitar program. Rich Matteson, who had been teaching jazz at the University of North Texas for 13 years, was hired in 1986 by the University of North Florida to build a program focusing on jazz. Petersen taught at UNF as resident artist and associate professor until his retirement in 1995, retiring fully in 1999.
 2003: Petersen moved to Prescott, Arizona, and performed as guest and clinician around the country.

He has worked with Dave Brubeck, Randy Brecker, Dallas Symphony Orchestra, Buddy DeFranco, Herb Ellis, Fort Worth Symphony Orchestra, Milt Hinton, Lena Horne, Stan Kenton, Peggy Lee, Michel Legrand, Henry Mancini, Lou Marini, Ellis Marsalis Jr., Rich Matteson, Matteson-Phillips Tubajazz Consort, Rufus Reid, Doc Severinsen, Billy Taylor, Clark Terry, and Nancy Wilson.

His students include John Abercrombie, Morris Acevedo, James Chirillo, Corey Christiansen, Vincent Gardner, Mick Goodrick, Jerry McGeorge, Marcus Printup, Richard Smith, John Tropea, Cynthia Nielsen, Clint Strong, and Doug Wamble.

Guitar lab innovation
While at Berklee, Petersen introduced a guitar lab concept that transformed guitar education, particularly jazz guitar, with respect to sight reading and with respect to accommodating large numbers of guitar students. He created a big band composed of 12 guitars in three units of four – one unit would cover the woodwinds of a big band, one would cover the trombones, and one would cover the trumpets. The guitar players read single notes, just like horn players — no chords. Later, Petersen helped his colleague at North Texas, Rich Matteson, develop a similar concept for low brass, creating a big band composed solely of low brass instruments. The Matteson-Phillips Tubajazz Consort was composed mostly of renowned professional artists and educators.

Discography
 The Five Strings (December 16, 1954)
 Rich Matteson Sextet, Pardon Our Dust, We're Making Changes, John Allred (musician), Shelly Berg, Jack Petersen, Lou Fischer, Louie Bellson; Four Leaf Clover (FLC CD 131) (1990)
 Dallas Jazz Orchestra, Hey Man! (1975)
 Phil Wilson & Rich Matteson, The Sound of the Wasp (1975)
 Phil Wilson, Live and Cookin' 
 Matteson-Phillips Tubajazz Consort, Mark Records (1978)
 Matteson-Phillips Tubajazz Consort, Superhorn (1981)
 Phil Wilson, Groovey (1981)
 North Texas State University, The NTSU Jazz Guitars (May 1983)
 Jamey Aebersold, Rhythm Section "Work-Out": Volume 30A & 30B, JA Records (1984)
 Diane Linscott, Singin' Around (2000)
 Diane Linscott, Alone/Together (2002)

Compositions and arrangements
 1981: Up Tight (BMI)
 1995: Magic of Brazil (BMI)
 1999: Hey Man
 2002: Denton Blues
 Scrapbook, Dallas Jazz Orchestra, Jazz Mark

Publications
 c1979: Jack Petersen, Jazz styles & analysis, guitar: a history of the jazz guitar via recorded solos, transcribed and annotated, Vols. I & II, Maher Publications
 1980: Jack Petersen, "Django Reinhardt's Guitar in 'Festival 48'", Down Beat Music '80, p. 52-53
 1981: Jack Petersen & Rich Matteson, Up Tight
 1981: Rich Matteson & Jack Petersen, Art of melodic motion: an improvisational study
 c1983: Dan Haerle, Jack Petersen, Rich Matteson, Jazz Tunes for Improvisation: A Graduated course of study for the jazz musician, Alfred Publishing
 1995: Rich Matteson, Jack Petersen, Music Minus One: The Art of Improvisation, Vol. 1, Music Minus One
 1995: Jack Petersen, Magic of Brazil
 2002: Jack Petersen, Beginning Guitar: Mastering the Keys: The Jack Petersen Guitar Series, Mel Bay
 2003: Jack Petersen, Chords Galore: A Systematic Approach to Voicing Chords on Guitar, Mel Bay

See also
 One O'Clock Lab Band

References

American jazz guitarists
Hard bop guitarists
Swing guitarists
American jazz composers
American male jazz composers
American music arrangers
Jazz arrangers
American jazz bandleaders
University of North Texas College of Music alumni
Berklee College of Music faculty
University of North Texas College of Music faculty
Living people
1933 births
American jazz educators
United States Army Band musicians
American male guitarists
20th-century American guitarists
20th-century American male musicians
Matteson-Phillips Tubajazz Consort members